Cuproxena speculana is a species of moth of the family Tortricidae. It is found in Guatemala.

Average wingspan is about 22 mm. The forewings are white with a delicate brown shade at the basal portion. The hindwings are silvery white.

References

Moths described in 1914
Cuproxena